Mill Creek Island is a bar island on the Ohio River in Tyler County, West Virginia. The island lies upstream from Grandview Island and the towns of New Matamoras, Ohio and Friendly, West Virginia. It takes its name from Mill Creek, which empties into the Ohio River from the Ohio side in its vicinity. Mill Creek Island is protected as part of the Ohio River Islands National Wildlife Refuge.

See also 
List of islands of West Virginia

References

River islands of West Virginia
Islands of Tyler County, West Virginia
Islands of the Ohio River